Country House (foaled May 8, 2016) is an American Thoroughbred racehorse who won the 2019 Kentucky Derby after the disqualification of Maximum Security.

Country House's win came as result of an objection call from jockey Flavien Prat. Even though Maximum Security crossed the finish line before Country House, Maximum Security was disqualified for interference with several horses and causing a near-spill. At odds of 65–1, Country House had the third highest odds of any Kentucky Derby winner, after Donerail in 1913 and Rich Strike in 2022.

Background
Country House is a chestnut colt bred in Kentucky by Joseph V. Shields Jr. He was sired by Lookin at Lucky, the winner of the 2010 Preakness Stakes. Lookin at Lucky first entered stud as a four-year-old in 2011 and since then has resided at Ashford Stud in Kentucky. He is also the sire of Accelerate, the 2018 American Champion Older Dirt Male Horse, Peter Pan Stakes winner Madefromlucky, and 2017 Kentucky Derby runner-up Lookin at Lee.

Country House's dam Quake Lake, a daughter of War Chant, was an allowance winner who won two of her six races. She is a half sister to Prince of Wales Stakes winner Breaking Lucky, who was also sired by Lookin at Lucky and is therefore a close relative of Country House.

Country House was foaled at Three Chimneys Farm on May 8, 2016. Quake Lake died shortly after giving birth to him, and so he was raised by a nurse mare. He moved to Lane's End Farm as a weanling to prepare for sale as a yearling. Due to his late birth date, he needed more time to develop physically, but was "always a correct, balanced and athletic individual" according to Andy Howard, the assistant yearling manager at Lane's End. Country House was entered in the 2017 Keeneland September yearling sale because owner Shields usually sold his yearling colts. However, he was withdrawn from the sale and kept.

Original owner Joseph Shields died in October 2018, shortly after Country House's first race, and Country House's ownership was taken over by Shields' wife, Maury, and his nephew, Guinness McFadden. Country House was trained by William I. Mott.

Racing career 
Country House's first race was on turf at Belmont Park on October 6, 2018, in which he was never a factor. Country House won his first race in his third start, a maiden special weight race at Gulfstream Park on January 17, 2019. After his maiden victory, LNJ Foxwoods purchased an interest in him. He finished 2nd at Risen Star, 3rd at the Arkansas Derby, and 4th at the Louisiana Derby.

In the Kentucky Derby on May 4, Maximum Security crossed the finish line first, but was judged to have impeded War of Will and Long Range Toddy when he swerved into their path, causing them to check strides. As a result, Maximum Security was disqualified, and Country House, who had crossed the finish line second, was declared the winner.

On May 7, Country House was ruled out of running in the 2019 Preakness Stakes, due to his trainer detecting a virus. This marked the first time the Kentucky Derby winner did not race in the Preakness Stakes since 1996.

Country House went on to develop a series of ailments that led to his retirement. According to a statement by McFadden's Blackwood Stables, he was first "diagnosed with proximal suspensory ligament desmitis on both front fetlocks" in June. Country House then experienced complications, leading to his hospitalization at Rood and Riddle Equine Hospital on July 1 for an infection on his lower right fore. Because the right fore was not load bearing during his recovery from the infection, his left fore had to bear the extra weight and developed laminitis. Over the next several months, the laminitis was stabilized and Country House was then turned out to pasture. He is expected to fully recover but will never be able to race again.

Stud career 
Country House will begin his career as a stallion at Darby Dan Farm in Lexington, Kentucky in 2021 for a fee of $7,500.

Pedigree
 

 Country House is inbred 4s × 3d to the stallion Danzig, meaning that he appears fourth generation on the sire side of his pedigree and third generation on the dam side of his pedigree. Country House is also inbred 4s × 4d to No Class, meaning he appears fourth generation on the sire side of his pedigree and fourth generation on the dam side of his pedigree.

See also
 List of historical horses
 Forward Pass (horse), declared winner of the 1968 Kentucky Derby following a disqualification

References

2016 racehorse births
Racehorses bred in Kentucky
Kentucky Derby winners
American racehorses